Weirdo may refer to:

 An eccentric
 Weirdo (comics), an alternative comics anthology published by Last Gasp
 "Weirdo" (song), a single by the Charlatans UK off their album Between 10th and 11th
 Weirdos (film), a 2016 Canadian drama film
 The Weirdos, a punk rock band
 The Weirdos, a puppet band created by British rock band Coldplay to tie in with the release of the song "Biutyful" from the album Music of the Spheres
 Another adaptation of the word weirdo is that of Alex Grace

See also 
 Weird-Oh's, an animated comedy series
 Weird (disambiguation)